County Route 517 (CR 517) is a county highway in the U.S. state of New Jersey. The highway extends  from Lamington Road (CR 523) in Tewksbury Township to the New York state line in Vernon Township where it continues as Orange County Route 26. It passes through mostly rural and exurban communities.

Route description

CR 517 begins at an intersection with CR 523 in the community of Oldwick in Tewksbury Township, Hunterdon County, heading north on two-lane undivided Main Street. The road passes homes and businesses before merging onto Joliet Street. At the intersection with King Street/Church Street, the route becomes Old Turnpike Road and leaves Oldwick to head into agricultural areas, curving more to the northwest. CR 517 makes a turn west into woodland before heading north again into a mix of woods, farms, and residential subdivisions. In this area, the route crosses CR 512.

A short distance past the CR 512 intersection in Fairmount, CR 517 crosses into Washington Township, Morris County and becomes Fairmount Road. The route continues through rural areas with residences as it makes a turn to the northwest and reaches the community of Long Valley, where there is an intersection with CR 513 in a business area.  At this point, CR 517 becomes Schooleys Mountain Road and is also signed by its former designation of Route 24. The road heads northwest, immediately crossing the South Branch Raritan River as it heads into woodland. The road turns west into areas of woods and homes prior to heading north across forested Schooleys Mountain. After crossing the mountain, CR 517 runs through a mix of farm fields and residential neighborhoods.

Upon crossing the Musconetcong River, CR 517 enters Hackettstown in Warren County and immediately intersects the eastern terminus of Route 57. At this intersection, Route 24 signage along CR 517 ends and the county route continues north along with Route 182 on Mountain Avenue, a four-lane undivided road that passes several businesses. Farther north, the road narrows to two lanes and becomes lined with homes. Upon reaching US 46, Route 182 ends and CR 517 turns northwest to run concurrent with US 46 on two-lane Main Street. The road runs through the commercial downtown of Hackettstown, with CR 517 splitting from US 46 by turning north onto High Street.

The road enters residential areas and crosses New Jersey Transit’s Morristown Line/Montclair-Boonton Line. The road passes to the west of a Mars, Incorporated factory before intersecting CR 654 and leaving Hackettstown for Independence Township. The road becomes Allamuchy Road and enters more wooded areas of homes and businesses, intersecting CR 665 before coming to another junction with CR 654. CR 517 crosses into Allamuchy Township and is briefly a three-lane road with two northbound lanes and one southbound lane. The road becomes two lanes again as it continues through forested areas with some agriculture and development, forming the western border of Allamuchy Mountain State Park. The route has an intersection with CR 653 before passing Allamuchy Pond and reaching an interchange with I-80. After this interchange, CR 667 briefly loops to the west of the road before it continues into more agricultural areas and turns to the northeast.

CR 517 crosses into Green Township, Sussex County, with the name becoming Decker Pond Road, and intersects CR 611 before passing to the northwest of Lake Tranquility, a lake in a wooded area that is surrounded by residential developments. Near the lake, the route has a junction with CR 603. The road runs through more areas of woodland and farmland as CR 517 makes a right turn onto Whitehall Road prior to making a turn to the left. The road enters Andover and becomes Brighton Avenue, passing under the abandoned Lackawanna Cutoff prior to entering residential areas. CR 517 crosses CR 606 before intersecting US 206. At this point, the route turns north to run along US 206 briefly through the commercial downtown of Andover before splitting and continuing east on Lenape Road. CR 517 curves northeast at the CR 613 junction and enters wooded areas with some farms and homes. The road continues into Andover Township  and enters forests with residential developments, passing to the southeast of Lake Lenape. The road turns to the east near Clearwater Lake and becomes Andover-Sparta Road as it runs a short distance to the south of Perona Lake. CR 517 enters Sparta Township and turns northeast again through more residential areas. The route turns east onto Sparta Road at the CR 616 junction and passes more wooded development as it comes to an intersection with Route 181 in a commercial area. A short distance later, CR 517 comes to an interchange with the Route 15 freeway.

Following this interchange, the route heads northeast and crosses under the New York, Susquehanna and Western Railway's New Jersey Subdivision line and runs immediately to the west of that railroad line as it continues through rural areas with homes. The road intersects CR 620 and becomes Ogdensburg Road as it turns north away from the railroad and crosses into Ogdensburg. Here, CR 517 becomes Main Street and continues past a mix of forests and residential subdivisions and passes residential and commercial development in the center of town. The road continues north into Franklin and runs through more rural areas prior to coming to the Route 23 junction. CR 517 heads north along with Route 23 and the road continues through residential and commercial areas of Franklin with a brief wide painted median near the CR 631 intersection. The road crosses a stream, Mill Brook, into Hamburg, where CR 517 splits from Route 23 by heading east on Quarry Road.

The road continues through wooded residential neighborhoods prior to entering Hardyston Township. Then, an alternate entrance to Crystal Springs Country Club appears prior to leaving Hardyston Twp. At this point, the route becomes Rudeville Road and heads northeast between residential areas to the west and wooded mountains to the east. The road crosses into Vernon Township and heads through more forests, reaching a junction with Route 94 near the Mountain Creek ski resort. At this intersection, CR 517 makes a turn to the west onto Route 94 and crosses the New York, Susquehanna and Western Railway line. The county route splits from Route 94 by heading north onto McAfee-Glenwood Road, continuing through a mix of homes and woods. CR 517 then intersects Lake Pochung Rd. Less than  later, (after Lake Pochung Rd.,) McPeek road appears. The road turns northeast and intersects CR 641 before heading east and making a turn northeast onto Sandhill Road. The road passes near residential subdivisions before turning north into a mix of farms, woods, and homes, crossing the Appalachian Trail.  CR 517 has an intersection with the northern terminus of CR 565 before coming to the New York border, where the road continues into Orange County, New York as CR 26.

History 

The section running from Hackettstown to Long Valley was originally created as part of the Washington Turnpike, which stretched from Morristown to Philipsburg, the road to Hackettstown being a branch of the main turnpike. This road was later incorporated into the William Penn Highway, connecting New York to Pittsburgh. The section of road running from Schooley's Mountain to Long Valley was incorporated into Route 24 in 1927, before being removed by 1992. Between Oldwick and Long Valley, the road was built as part of the New Germantown Turnpike, which was legislated in 1813 to run from the Washington Turnpike to the Jersey Turnpike. South of Oldwick, the turnpike was superseded by County Routes 523 and 665. The Pochuk Turnpike was legislated in 1816 to run north from what is now Route 94 to the New York border.

County Route 517 was designated in 1952. An alternate route, CR 517 Alternate, existed, which is now CR 616, CR 663, Route 94, Route 15, and CR 661.

Major intersections

See also

References

External links 

NJ State Highways: CR 515-530

500-series county routes in New Jersey
Roads in Hunterdon County, New Jersey
Roads in Morris County, New Jersey
Roads in Sussex County, New Jersey
Roads in Warren County, New Jersey